is a professional footballer who represented New Zealand at international level, before gaining Japanese citizenship in 2013 and plays club football for Albirex Niigata.

Early life
Fitzgerald received his secondary education at St Peter's College, Auckland (1999–2005). He is the brother of Isaac Fitzgerald.

Fitzgerald's application for Japanese citizenship was approved in May 2013 in doing so he could not play for the All Whites again. His former name is Fitzgerald Michael James (フィッツジェラルド・マイケル・ジェームズ).

Club career

Youth career
In 2005, Fitzgerald begin career at Seiritsu Gakuen High School as youth team until he graduated in 2007.

Senior career
In 2008, after graduated from high school, Fitzgerald begin career in J1 club, Albirex Niigata as first team. After 2009, he transferred to JSC Niigata, Zweigen Kanazawa and V-Varen Nagasaki on loan until 2013.

He return to Albirex Niigata until 2016.

In 2017, Fitzgerald transferred to Kawasaki Frontale until 2019 cause he was play 3 matches in J1 appearances.

In 2019, he return to former club,  Albirex Niigata. On 23 October 2022, he brought his club promoted to J1 League from 2023 season as well champions of J2 League in 2022.

International career
Fitzgerald made his international New Zealand debut in a 1–1 draw with China on 25 March 2011. He later made two more appearances for New Zealand in friendly matches including a 3–0 loss to Mexico and another 3–0 loss to Australia.

Career statistics

Club
.

International

Honours

Club
Kawasaki Frontale
J1 League: 2017 , 2018
J.League Cup Runner-up: 2017
Japanese Super Cup Runner-up: 2018

V-Varen Nagasaki
Japan Football League: 2012

Albirex Niigata
J2 League: 2022

Individual
Japan Football League Team of the Year : 2012
J2 League Team of the Year : 2022

References

External links
Profile at Soccerway
Profile at Kawasaki Frontale 
Profile at Zweigen Kanazawa 

1988 births
Living people
People educated at St Peter's College, Auckland
Sportspeople from Tokoroa
Association football central defenders
New Zealand association footballers
New Zealand international footballers
J1 League players
J2 League players
Japan Football League players
Albirex Niigata players
Japan Soccer College players
Zweigen Kanazawa players
V-Varen Nagasaki players
Kawasaki Frontale players
New Zealand people of Japanese descent
New Zealand expatriate association footballers
Expatriate footballers in Japan
Naturalized citizens of Japan